Suketu Mehta is the New York-based author of Maximum City: Bombay Lost and Found, which won the Kiriyama Prize and the Hutch Crossword Award, and was a finalist for the 2005 Pulitzer Prize, the Lettre Ulysses Prize, the BBC4 Samuel Johnson Prize, and the Guardian First Book Award. His autobiographical account of his experiences in Mumbai, Maximum City, was published in 2004. The book, based on two and a half years research, explores the underbelly of the city.

He has won a New York Foundation for the Arts Fellowship for his fiction. Mehta’s work has been published in The New Yorker, The New York Times Magazine, National Geographic, Granta, Harper’s, Time, Newsweek, The New York Review of Books and Scroll.in, and has been featured on NPR’s Fresh Air, and NPR's All Things Considered. Mehta has also written original screenplays for films, including New York, I Love You (2008) and Mission Kashmir with novelist Vikram Chandra.

His latest book This Land Is Our Land: An Immigrant's Manifesto, was published in June 2019 
 under a 2007 Guggenheim fellowship.

Personal life
Mehta was born in Kolkata, India, to Gujarati parents and raised in Mumbai, where he lived until his family moved to the New York area in 1977. He is a graduate of New York University and the University of Iowa Writers' Workshop. Mehta is a cancer survivor.

Mehta is an Associate Professor of Journalism at New York University and lives in Manhattan.

Awards

He won a Whiting Award in 1997.
He won the O. Henry Prize for his short story Gare du Nord published in Harper's Magazine in 1997.
He won a Fellowship of the New York Foundation for the Arts.
He won a 2007 Guggenheim Fellowship.
2005 Pulitzer Prize finalist for the book Maximum City.
Maximum City was also chosen as one of the books of the year 2004 by The Economist.
Maximum City won the 2005 Kiriyama Prize.

Works

 
This Land Is Our Land: An Immigrant's Manifesto. Farrar, Straus and Giroux. 2019.

Filmography

As writer

See also
 Lists of American writers
 List of Indian writers

References

External links

Suketu Mehta, official web site.
Profile at The Whiting Foundation
Interview with the Wall Street Journal
Interview in The Believer magazine by Karan Mahajan
Interview with Venkatesan Vembu, Daily News & Analysis
Lettre Ulysses Award Biography (broken link as of 27 Oct 2012)
SAJAforum on his NYU appointment

1963 births
Living people
Indian emigrants to the United States
Iowa Writers' Workshop alumni
New York University alumni
New York University faculty
Writers from Kolkata
American autobiographers
American male journalists
American writers of Indian descent
American short story writers
American male short story writers
English-language writers from India
Gujarati people
American people of Gujarati descent